Jinan (Ji-n'an; Tsi-n'an; Chi-n'an) is the capital of Shandong province, China.

Jinan or Jin'an or Ji-Nan or variant, may also refer to:

Places
Jinan County, North Jeolla Province, South Korea
Jinan, Iran, a village in South Khorasan Province, Iran
Jinan or Jihnan, a former transliteration of Rinan (Vietnamese: Nhat Nam), a former prefecture of the Han dynasty (Chinese) province of Jiaozhi in modern Vietnam

In China
Jinan Military Region, formerly covering Shandong and Henan, disbanded in 2016 reforms
Jinan University, in Guangzhou, Guangdong
Jinan Commandery (濟南郡), historical commandery of China

Districts
Jin'an District, Fuzhou, Fujian
Jin'an District, Lu'an, Anhui

Towns
Jin'an Town, Sichuan, subdivision of Songpan County, Sichuan
Jin'an, Yunnan (zh), town in and subdivision of Gucheng District, Lijiang, Yunnan
 Jinan, Hubei (zh), town in and subdivision of Jingzhou District, Jingzhou, Hubei
 Jinan, the ancient capital of the state of Chu, presently at Jiangling County, Hubei (zh).

Townships
Jin'an Township, Yanting County (zh), subdivision of Yanting County, Sichuan
Jin'an Hui Ethnic Township (zh), subdivision of Songpan County, Sichuan

People
Jin An
 Jin An (born 1996), Taiwanese-Korean basketball player for South Korea
 Jin An, New Zealand politician, one of the candidates in the 2017 New Zealand general election by electorate
 Jin An (18th century), publisher of the Qi Lin Bayin
 Yan Jin An, founding first honorary president of Asia Ski Mountaineering Federation
 Emperor An of Jin (Jin An Di; 383–419)

Ji Nan
 Ji Nan, a Chinese soccer player; see List of Chinese football transfers winter 2012
 Ji Nan, a Chinese swimmer at the Swimming at the 2010 South American Games – Women's 200 metre butterfly

Military
Jinan (ship), two ships of the People's Liberation Army Navy of China
Jinan Incident (1928), between the Nationalists of China and the Imperial Japanese
Battle of Jinan (1948), between the Nationalists and Communists during the Civil War

Other uses
Jinan dialect, dialect of the Mandarin language family, spoken in Jinan, Shandong, China

See also

 
 Ji (disambiguation)
 Nan (disambiguation)
 Jin (disambiguation)
 An (disambiguation)
 Anjin (disambiguation)
 Nanji